Caravan Palace is a French electronic band based in Paris. The band's influences include Django Reinhardt, Vitalic, Lionel Hampton, and Daft Punk. The band released their debut studio album, Caravan Palace, on the Wagram label in October 2008. The record charted in Switzerland, Belgium, and France, where it reached a peak position of number 11.

History 
The band formed as a three-piece when they were recruited to compose the soundtrack for a silent adult film. Loïc Barrouk took an interest in the project and booked the band a recording studio and a series of gigs. More performers were required for the live concerts, and current band members Zoé Colotis & Paul-Marie Barbier, as well as former members Camille Chapelière and Antoine Toustou were found after searching on MySpace.

The band became popular on the internet after releasing a number of demos and promo singles. From 2006 to 2007 they spent a year touring around France, and their first festival appearance came at the Django Reinhardt Jazz Festival in 2007. Following this emergence, the group were signed by the Paris-based Wagram Music record label. They spent the next year recording material for their debut studio album.

On 20 October 2008 the self-titled Caravan Palace was released, preceded by the single "Jolie Coquine". The album received praise for its traditional jazz inclinations, and placed in a number of European albums charts. In Switzerland, the album reached number 72 and in Belgium it achieved a position of 42. The album performed best in the band's native France where it attained a peak position of 11 in August 2009, and remained on the French albums chart for 68 consecutive weeks. The band released their second official single, "Suzy", on 24 February 2009.

On 3 October 2011, the band released an EP titled Clash, featuring two new songs and four remixes of them. The band's second album, Panic, was released on 5 March 2012. Their third album, <°_°> (also known as Robot Face or Robot), was released on 16 October 2015.

In 2015, they appeared on Later... with Jools Holland on 27 and 30 October, and on The Jonathan Ross Show on 31 October. Subsequently, they appeared on Jools' Annual Hootenanny on 31 December 2016 – 1 January 2017 singing a cover of "Black Betty" and "Lone Digger".

Their latest album, Chronologic, was released on 30 August 2019.

Band members
Current
Zoé Colotis – vocals
Arnaud "Vial" de Bosredon – composition, production, guitar, vocals
Charles Delaporte – composition, production, bass, vocals
Paul-Marie Barbier – piano, percussion, vibraphone
Martin Berlugue – trombone
Lucas Saint-Cricq – saxophone, clarinet
Odd Sweet – dancer
Former
Hugues Payen – violin, vocals
Camille Chapelière – saxophone, clarinet
Victor Raimondeau – saxophone
Antoine Toustou – trombone

Timeline

Discography

Studio albums

Extended plays

Singles

Music videos

* Unlike the band's other videos, the video for "Mighty" is a compilation of video clips of robots from across science fiction and, as such, has no single director.

References

French electronic music groups
Musical groups established in 2008
Electro swing musicians